The Mating of Marcella is a lost 1918 American drama silent film directed by Roy William Neill, and written by Joseph F. Poland and R. Cecil Smith. The film stars Dorothy Dalton, Thurston Hall, Juanita Hansen, William Conklin, Donald MacDonald and Milton Ross. The film was released on May 20, 1918, by Paramount Pictures.

Plot

Cast
Dorothy Dalton as Marcella Duranzo
Thurston Hall as Robert Underwood
Juanita Hansen as Lois Underwood
William Conklin as Count Louis Le Favri
Donald MacDonald as Jack Porter
Milton Ross as Pedro Escobar
Spottiswoode Aitken as Jose Duranzo
Buster Irving as Bobby Underwood

References

External links 
 

1918 films
1918 lost films
1910s English-language films
Silent American drama films
1918 drama films
Paramount Pictures films
Films directed by Roy William Neill
American black-and-white films
Lost American films
American silent feature films
Films with screenplays by Joseph F. Poland
1910s American films